Volker Blumentritt (born 16 June 1946 in Jena) is a German politician and member of the SPD.

From 2005 until 2009, Blumentritt was a member of the Bundestag representing Gera – Saale-Holzland-Kreis. At the 2009 election his constituency was expanded following boundary changes to become Gera – Jena – Saale-Holzland-Kreis, which he unsuccessfully contested.

Early life 
After attending the Polytechnic Secondary School, Blumentritt completed an apprenticeship as a chef from 1963 to 1966 and then did his military service until 1969. Afterwards he worked from 1974 at Mitropa. From 1990 to 2003 he was chairman of the works council of Mitropa AG at the Gera site and a member of the central works council.

Volker Blumentritt is married, lives separated and has two children.

References

External links 
  

1946 births
Living people
Politicians from Jena
Members of the Bundestag for Thuringia
Recipients of the Cross of the Order of Merit of the Federal Republic of Germany
Members of the Bundestag 2005–2009
Members of the Bundestag for the Social Democratic Party of Germany
Works councillors